Martin Lindman (born March 27, 1974, in Uppsala, Sweden) is a retired professional Swedish ice hockey player.

Lindman played for Cardiff Devils in the British Hockey League. In Germany his career included Krefeld Pinguine, Eisbären Berlin and Augsburger Panther of the Deutsche Eishockey Liga. He also played in his native country for Timrå IK, Färjestads BK, Malmö Redhawks, and Djurgårdens IF in the Swedish Elite League.

External links
 

1974 births
Living people
Swedish ice hockey defencemen
Swedish expatriate ice hockey players in Germany
Expatriate ice hockey players in Wales
Cardiff Devils players
Krefeld Pinguine players
Eisbären Berlin players
Timrå IK players
Färjestad BK players
Malmö Redhawks players
Augsburger Panther players
Djurgårdens IF Hockey players
Sportspeople from Uppsala
Swedish expatriate sportspeople in Wales